Charles Bouton may refer to:

 Charles L. Bouton (1869–1922), American mathematician
 Charles Marie Bouton (1781–1853), French painter